A Different Stage is the debut studio album by English comedian and actor Jason Manford. The album was released on 6 October 2017 by Decca Records. It features some of Manford's favourite show tunes.

Background
Manford has stated that before becoming a comedian he had believed he would follow a career in music: "I've been singing since I was a boy, I always thought I’d probably be a singer rather than a stand-up, but that’s just the way it happened". He made his West End debut as Italian barber Adolfo Pirelli in the musical Sweeney Todd in 2012. He has also appeared as Leo Bloom in The Producers (2014), and Caractacus Potts in Chitty Chitty Bang Bang (2016), a role which won him very favourable reviews. His decision to record an album of show tunes came after a version of him performing "Stars" from the musical Les Miserables alongside actor and singer Alfie Boe was uploaded to YouTube, where it proved to be popular, and after fans left messages on Manford's Facebook page urging him to record an album. Manford has also cited his grandmother as an encouraging force.

It was announced in July 2017 that Manford would be releasing an album of show tunes inspired by his stage career, and that the album would be released in October. The album was released on 6 October. As part of the album's launch, Manford attended a signing event at HMV in Manchester's Arndale Centre. Manford also recorded a video of him playing the album to his grandmother, which was posted on his Facebook page. The album is also dedicated to his paternal grandparents: "who every Sunday at their house would play so many old songs and tunes from musicals that they became ingrained in my own musical taste to this day".

In September, Manford entertained staff and residents at a Manchester care home with songs from the album after a member of staff contacted him to ask him to visit. He also performed tracks from the album for a charity event at the city's Hilton Hotel. Upon the release of A Different Stage, Manford announced plans for a music tour in 2018, consisting of "a handful of gigs of me with an orchestra going through songs on the album".

During recording of the album, Manford travelled to Prague to record with the Prague Symphony Orchestra.

Track listing

Charts

References

2017 debut albums
Classical albums by English artists
Jason Manford albums
Decca Records albums